Tennys Sandgren and Rhyne Williams were the defending champions, but they lost in the first round.

John-Patrick Smith and Matt Reid won the title, defeating Jarmere Jenkins and Donald Young in the final, 7–6(7–1), 4–6, [14–12].

Seeds

Draw

Draw

References
 Main Draw
 Qualifying Draw

Sacramento Challenger - Doubles
2013 Doubles